WCCN (1370 AM) is a radio station  broadcasting an adult standards format. It is licensed to Neillsville, Wisconsin, United States. The station is currently owned by Central Wisconsin Broadcasting, Inc. and features programming from ABC Radio.

References

External links

CCN
Adult standards radio stations in the United States
Radio stations established in 1957